This was the first edition of the tournament and the first Challenger tournament in Turin since 2011.

Mats Moraing won the title after defeating Quentin Halys 7–6(13–11), 6–3 in the final.

Seeds

Draw

Finals

Top half

Bottom half

References

External links
Main draw
Qualifying draw

Torino Challenger - 1